Southern Victoria High School is a school located in Perth-Andover, New Brunswick. It is located in the Anglophone West School District.

References

Schools in Victoria County, New Brunswick
High schools in New Brunswick